Jezken (also Dazgon) is a village in Leylek District of Batken Region of Kyrgyzstan. It is situated along the river Ak-Suu, near the border with Tajikistan. Its population was 268 in 2021.

References 

Populated places in Batken Region